Foreign relations between Australia and the Soviet Union informally began on 8 August, 1924, when the United Kingdom signed a treaty with the Soviet Union that was applicable to all British realms and formally began in 1942.

History

1917–1941 
After the February Revolution of 1917 in Russia, which led to the abdication of Tsar Nicholas II, the Consul-General of Russia for the Commonwealth of Australia and for the Dominion of New Zealand, Alexander Nikolayevich Abaza, expressed his support for the Russian Provisional Government and was instrumental in raising funds to repatriate Russians in Australia back to Russia after 500 expatriates petitioned Alexander Kerensky. Abaza wrote to Prime Minister William Hughes on 24 December 1917: "During whatever time I may act here nominally as Consul-General for Russia I shall only represent those of my people who are absolutely faithful to the Allies." Australia saw the Bolshevik signing of the Treaty of Brest-Litovsk with Germany after the October Revolution to be an act of treachery towards the Allies, and put a halt to migration from Australia to Russia. With the onset of the Russian Civil War, British intervention in the war saw many Australians serving in the British army in the Russian North and Central Asia in support of the White Army. On Australia Day (26 January) in 1918, Abaza wrote to the Prime Minister, advising him conditions made his commission in Melbourne untenable, and that he would be resigning as Consul-General as of the following day. His resignation was followed by the resignation of Vice-Consuls in Hobart, Perth, Darwin, Newcastle, Port Pirie and Melbourne.

In March 1918, after the resignation of Abaza, Peter Simonov presented himself to the Australian government as the representative of the Bolshevik government in Australia, and asked for recognition as the new Russian Consul. Given the signing of the Treaty of Brest-Litovsk he was advised that the Australian government did not recognise the Bolsheviks, and would not recognise him as Consul. Aware of Simonov's connections with Australian left-wing revolutionary groups, the Australian government repeatedly rejected calls for his recognition as the representative of the Soviet Union in Australia, and barred Simonov from teaching Bolshevism politics in Australia; an act for which he was later imprisoned for six months. Michael Considine, Member of the House of Representatives for Barrier assumed the unrecognised role of representative of the Soviets. Anti-Russian sentiment became stronger during this period, and was exemplified by the March 1919 anti-Bolshevik demonstrations in Brisbane, which were dubbed the Red Flag Riots, and until the United Kingdom's recognition of the Soviet Union in 1924, bilateral relations between Australia and the Soviet Union continued to be de jure non-existent.

On 8 August 1924, the United Kingdom signed the General Treaty with the Soviet Union which extended British diplomatic recognition to the USSR, and was also considered applicable to the British dominions of Canada, New Zealand, the Union of South Africa, the Irish Free State, Newfoundland, and Australia. The Nationalist Prime Minister Stanley Bruce disputed the nature of the Treaty, saying that self-governing parts of the Empire were not consulted, it did not take into account Australia's rights to sign treaties with foreign countries and it ignored Australia's trade interests. Bruce was also concerned that allegations of the Soviet Union spreading propaganda in Australia, which regarded communism as a menace, were not addressed. The Treaty was not entered into as a treaty of George V on behalf of the Empire, but between two governments, and according to Bruce, Australia was in no way bound by the Treaty, and the Australian Press Association stated that there was initially an unsympathetic view in Australia towards restoring diplomatic relations with the Soviet Union. Izvestia reported Ramsay MacDonald had campaigned for Prime Minister of the United Kingdom on a platform which included restoring ties with the Soviet Union and hence the Soviet Union should seize upon this and "advance conditions and demand guarantees". In July 1929, Bruce sent a communication to MacDonald, acquiescing to the establishment of diplomatic relations with the Soviet Union, provided that Soviet propaganda ceased. It was the opinion of the Australian government that the Soviet Union had been spreading propaganda in Australia, but it was unable to provide specific evidence of this being the case. On 20 and 21 December 1929, notes were exchanged in Moscow and London which saw the resumption of diplomatic relations between the Soviet Union and the United Kingdom and its Dominions, including Australia. The notes included a pledge by the Soviet Union to refrain from hostile propaganda, which was part of the unratified 1924 Treaty.

1941–1948 
After the German invasion of the Soviet Union on 22 June 1941 during World War II, the Labor government of John Curtin began to discuss sending a diplomatic delegation to the Soviet Union. The Congress of Friendship and Aid to the Soviet urged the posting of Australian diplomats in the Soviet Union, and also pushed for exchanging military, air and naval missions between the two countries.  in October 1941 visited Arkhangelsk bringing a British trade delegation from Iceland; marking the beginning of the Lend-Lease program in support of the Soviet Union.

H. V. Evatt, the Australian Minister for External Affairs on 4 November 1941 wrote in a secret submission to the war cabinet that the Government had received a large number of representations from interested parties since the outbreak of the Russo-German War, and that the major views in support of sending a diplomatic delegation to the Soviet Union included the necessity to provide material and moral support to the Soviet Union and to encourage its resistance against the Germans, the sharing of a common interest in policy towards Japan and the Middle East, and the potential for Australian-Soviet trade, and its importance to the Australian economy.

Whilst Australia's reasons for the exchange of diplomatic missions were known, it was also understood that the Soviet government believed at first that the exchange would serve no great purpose, due to the minimal ties between the two countries, commercial or otherwise. Both countries acknowledged that if relations, particularly trade relations, were to become a reality that diplomatic relations would be required as a formality. Evatt began negotiations with Soviet People's Commissar for Foreign Affairs Vyacheslav Molotov in London in May 1942, and the 10 October 1942 agreement between the two countries to exchange diplomatic representatives was regarded in Australia as a diplomatic coup, given the Soviet Union's position as a great power in the Pacific region. The first diplomatic representatives were Andrey Vlasov for the Soviet Union, and William Slater for Australia.

In 1942–43, joint Commonwealth naval and air forces, under British commanders, were based in North Russia, while involved in convoys bringing supplies to the Soviet Union. For instance, under the code name Operation Orator, between August and November 1942, a British-Australian air wing – including 455 Squadron, Royal Australian Air Force, operated Handley Page Hampden torpedo bombers from bases near Murmansk, where they successfully deterred operations off North Cape by German battleships and cruisers.

Slater opened the Australian Legation in Kuybyshev, the temporary seat of the Soviet government, on 2 January 1943, and moved to Moscow on 12 August 1943. Vlasov arrived in Canberra on 5 March 1943 to head the Soviet Legation, and presented his Letters of Credence to Governor-General Lord Gowrie on 10 March 1943 at Government House. The Soviet Legation in Canberra was upgraded to Embassy status on 12 July 1945 and the Australian Legation in Moscow was upgraded on 16 February 1948.

1948–1963 

As with other Western countries, Australia's relations with the USSR deteriorated in the late 1940s, as the Iron Curtain descended across Europe and Soviet proxy governments were established in several Eastern European countries. Australia was gripped in a red scare similar to that which led to McCarthyism in the United States.

During late 1948 and early 1949, the Australian government – like most of the former Western Allies – actively opposed a Soviet land blockade of West Berlin, and took part in the Berlin airlift. The RAAF Berlin Airlift Squadron was formed for this purpose. Following the outbreak of the Korean War in 1950, Australian and Soviet foreign policy were diametrically opposed. Australia was the first country after the United States to deploy forces to Korea, under what became known as United Nations Command.

Attempts by the new Liberal Prime Minister Robert Menzies to outlaw the Communist Party of Australia were overturned in the High Court of Australia (see Australian Communist Party v Commonwealth) and defeated at a referendum in 1951. Members on both sides of the Australian House of Representatives advocated severing diplomatic relations with the Soviet Union. Relations between Australia and the Soviet Union hit a low point when Vladimir Petrov, the Third Secretary of the Soviet embassy in Canberra, an associate and appointee of Lavrentiy Beria who feared execution if he returned to the Soviet Union, defected at the end of his three-year assignment on 3 April 1954 with the help of the Australian Security Intelligence Organisation and was given political asylum. The defection, which became known as the Petrov Affair, was disclosed by Menzies on 13 April 1954, the eve of the last day of Parliament before the May federal election. In his notice to Parliament Menzies disclosed that Petrov was an agent of the MVD and turned over to the Australian authorities details of Soviet intelligence operations in Australia, and announced intention for a Royal Commission to investigate Petrov's information, which included allegations of a Soviet fifth column being created in Australia. The revelations shocked the Australian public, which was more attuned to such things happening overseas. It was also reported that Evdokia Petrova, Petrov's wife and fellow MVD agent, had decided to stay with the Soviet Embassy in Canberra, and on 14 April, Petrova and Nikolai Generalov, the Soviet ambassador, accused Australian security services of kidnapping Petrov. On 19 April, the affair took another twist when Petrova was being escorted onto a waiting BOAC Constellation at Kingsford Smith Airport by Soviet diplomatic couriers for a flight back to the Soviet Union. William Wentworth took statutory declarations from Russian and Czechoslovakian anti-communists in the crowd who had stormed the tarmac to prevent Petrova from leaving, that they had heard her say Petrova calling out in Russian "I do not want to go. Save me", and asked Menzies to make the aircraft stop at Darwin in order to ask Petrova whether she wanted to leave Australia. Contrary to reports, Petrova did not cry out for help at Sydney Airport, but the aircraft did stop at Darwin Airport on a scheduled fuel-stop, enabling Australian security services to interview Petrova. After talking to Reginald Sylvester Leydin, the Government secretary, and to her husband on the phone, Petrova accepted the Australian government's offer of asylum and defected. The Soviets accused the Menzies government of manufacturing the defection of Petrov as an election stunt, ostensibly to boost his support in the upcoming elections, and on 21 April they also levelled against Petrov charges that he had misappropriated Embassy funds. Menzies dismissed the allegations, stating that he was waiting for such charges to be levelled as they were in the Gouzenko case in Canada, and also went on to say he believed the charges contradicted the Soviets' initial allegation that Petrov was kidnapped. The Australian government refused to hand over Petrov, who was deemed by the Soviets to be a criminal, and the Soviet government responded on 23 April 1954 by severing diplomatic relations with Australia, which saw the Soviet Embassy in Canberra being recalled and the Australian Embassy in Moscow being expelled. The Soviet decision was not unexpected, as it was thought by the Australian government to have been one possible response, but the swiftness of the decision was said to have shocked government advisers. The severance of diplomatic relations led to rumours that the Soviet Olympic team would not compete at the 1956 Melbourne Olympics. In the absence of diplomatic relations, the Soviet Union's interests in Australia were represented by Sweden, and Australia's interests in the Soviet Union were represented by the United Kingdom.

In aid of Soviet preparations for its commitments to the International Geophysical Year on 29 August 1955 and in the absence of diplomatic relations, Australia sent the Soviets a note, via the British Embassy in Moscow, offering facilities in Australia for the use of the Soviets in the instance they were required. Australia wanted to keep the Soviets out of the Antarctic but wanted to avoid international condemnation for going against the spirit of the IGY. The Australians also used the note as a ruse, albeit an unsuccessful one, to force the Soviets to recognise the Australian Antarctic Territory and hence, Australian claims over parts of the Antarctic. The Lena arrived in Port Adelaide on 28 March 1956 after its journey to the Antarctic. The Soviets gave free public access to the ship during its stay, and among the first people to visit the ship and meet with the crew was Douglas Mawson. Australian naval intelligence exploited the situation and sent two civilian agents on board the ship while it was open to the public. It is unknown what information they would have obtained as the scientists on the ship openly shared their knowledge and demonstrated equipment to anybody who was interested, and allowed the public to wander around without obstruction. The Ob arrived in Adelaide on 21 April 1956 and was also visited by Mawson and others within the scientific community in Adelaide. The Ob was invited by the Australia–USSR Friendship Society and the Building Workers' Industrial Union to visit Melbourne and Sydney, respectively, and Mawson lobbied to have the visits go ahead, but permission was denied by Minister of External Affairs Richard Casey. The decision was criticised by Mawson, and he made note of the Commonwealth Scientific and Industrial Research Organisation losing an opportunity to view the latest oceanographic research technology.

The two countries agreed to resume diplomatic relations on 13 March 1959 and it was reported that Australia insisted on screening Soviet diplomatic personnel. The Soviet Embassy in Canberra reopened on 2 June 1959, but the Soviet Union did not have a permanent ambassador until mid-1962. On 7 February 1963 the Australian government declared First Secretary at the Soviet Embassy in Canberra Ivan Skripov persona non grata after he was accused by ASIO of being a spy. According to ASIO, Skripov recruited Kay Marshall, an ASIO agent, firstly by giving her small tasks to gauge her suitability as an agent. In December 1962 Skripov gave Marshall a package which she was to give to a contact in Adelaide, but the contact did not meet Marshall as planned. The package, which had already been inspected by ASIO, contained coded transmission timetables for a Soviet radio station, along with a high-speed message sender which could be attached to a radio transmitter. Two months later the Australian government produced photos of meetings between Skripov and Marshall, and sent the embassy a note declaring Skripov persona non grata for "elaborate preparations for espionage" and gave him seven days to leave the country. The Australian government did not divulge what secrets Skripov may have been seeking, but it was reported that workers at the Woomera missile range underwent interrogation. The Soviets responded by stating that the materials released by ASIO proved nothing and were produced to hinder the development of friendly relations between the Soviet Union and Australia, and declared that Ambassador Ivan Kurdyukov, who was on sick leave in Moscow, would not return to Australia.

1963–1991 
During the period of Cold War détente, relations between Australia and the Soviet Union were seen as stronger during the Whitlam government. On 3 July 1974, then Prime Minister Gough Whitlam, as Acting Foreign Minister, took the decision to grant de jure recognition of the incorporation of Estonia, Latvia and Lithuania into the USSR. The Australian ambassador to Moscow visited Tallinn, Estonia, on 28–30 July 1974, effectively according de jure recognition. Soviet authorities subsequently leaked this information on 3 August 1974, confirmed by a spokesperson for the Ministry of Foreign Affairs a day later. Whitlam had neither informed nor consulted with the Minister for Foreign Affairs, Senator Willesee, who had been absent abroad, the Cabinet, Caucus, nor Parliament. In taking this controversial decision Whitlam also reneged on pre-election commitments made in correspondences to organizations representing emigrees from all three Baltic nations. Willesee, who upon his return supported Whitlam's decision and subsequently confirmed Whitlam's decision as "unilateral," was eventually censured by the Australian Parliament on 18 September 1974 for his part: "That the Minister for Foreign Affairs is deserving of censure and ought to resign because: in breach of a clear undertaking to the contrary given by the Prime Minister the Government shamefully and furtively extended recognition to the incorporation of the Baltic States in the U.S.S.R., the Minister withholding any announcement or explanation of the decision."

During Question Time in October 1974, Whitlam explained his decision to recognise the de jure incorporation the Baltic states into the Soviet Union was one which did not imply approval of the way in which former states were incorporated, but an acknowledgement of existing realities at the time. Whitlam, ascribed by his political opposition as "want[ing] a good response when he visits Russia", became the first Australian Prime Minister to visit Moscow in January 1975. Whitlam was not received by General Secretary of the Communist Party of the Soviet Union Leonid Brezhnev, who for "reasons of health" was unable to meet him, but instead by Alexei Kosygin, the Chairman of the Soviet of Ministers of the USSR.

During Whitlam's visit to the USSR, two agreements were signed between the two countries on 15 January 1975: the Agreement between the Government of Australia and the Government of the Union of Soviet Socialist Republics on Scientific-Technical Co-operation and the Agreement between the Government of Australia and the Government of the Union of Soviet Socialist Republics on Cultural Co-operation. Following the dismissal of the Whitlam government in 1975 and the resultant election which saw the installation of a conservative Liberal-Country Party coalition government under the leadership of Malcolm Fraser, recognition of the incorporation of the three Baltic states by the Soviet Union was rescinded by Australia in December 1975, and relations became more pragmatic.

In April 1983, ASIO provided information to the Australian government concerning First Secretary of the Soviet Embassy in Canberra Valery Ivanov. According to ASIO, Ivanov had formed a friendship with former national secretary of the Australian Labor Party David Combe. Bill Hayden, the Australian Foreign Minister, stated that he hoped Ivanov's expulsion would serve as an example to those who were to "work against Australia's interests". The Soviet Embassy responded by denying all charges and called the allegations "far-fetched". The Combe–Ivanov Affair was subject to a Royal Commission presided over by Robert Marsden Hope, which saw Prime Minister Bob Hawke giving evidence for 20 consecutive sitting days.

Australian Prime Minister Bob Hawke arrived in Leningrad on 30 November 1987 for discussion on economics, trade and foreign policy with Mikhail Gorbachev. During the visit, Hawke gave the names of Soviet Jews who wished to leave the Soviet Union to Gorbachev, and on 4 December 1987, 60 to 75 Jews were given permission to leave the country.

See also
 Australia–Russia relations
 Australia–Russian Empire relations

References

Notes

 
Soviet Union
Bilateral relations of the Soviet Union